Laa or LAA may refer to:

Laa
 Laa an der Thaya, Lower Austria
 Laa (Gemeinde Zettling), Styria
 Laa Formation, geologic formation in Austria
Laa River, Sulawesi, Indonesia
 Laalaa people, an ethnic group in Senegal
 Lehar language, a language spoken by the Laalaa people of Senegal
 Lehar Region also called Laa, located in Senegal
 Laa (TV serial)
 Laa Laa, a character from the children's TV show, Teletubbies

LAA
 Legal Aid Agency, an agency of the UK's Ministry of Justice
 L'Artibonite in Action, a political party of Haiti
 Lamar Municipal Airport (Colorado), via its IATA airport code and FAA location identifier

 Libyan Airlines, via its ICAO airline designator

 License Assisted Access
 Local area agreement
 Locally Administered Address, a type of MAC address
 Los Angeles Airways, a former helicopter airline
 Los Angeles Angels, a baseball team
 Latrobe Athletic Association, a late 19th-early 20th century American football club
 London Ashford Airport Ltd., the operator of Lydd Airport
 Light Aircraft Association, UK based organisation for recreational flying
 Large Address Awareness, a memory addressing mode in x86-64 processors
 Lebanese Arab Army

See also 

 Lah (disambiguation)